An MDS matrix (maximum distance separable) is a matrix representing a function with certain diffusion properties that have useful applications in cryptography.
Equivalently, the set of all -tuples  is an MDS code, i.e., a linear code that reaches the Singleton bound.

This is also equivalent to the following: all the sub-determinants of the matrix  are non-zero. Then a binary matrix  (namely over the field with two elements) is never MDS unless it has only one row or only one column with all components .

Reed–Solomon codes have the MDS property and are frequently used to obtain the MDS matrices used in cryptographic algorithms.

Serge Vaudenay suggested using MDS matrices in cryptographic primitives to produce what he called multipermutations, not-necessarily linear functions with this same property. These functions have what he called perfect diffusion: changing  of the inputs changes at least  of the outputs. He showed how to exploit imperfect diffusion to cryptanalyze functions that are not multipermutations.

MDS matrices are used for diffusion in such block ciphers as AES, SHARK, Square, Twofish, Anubis, KHAZAD, Manta, Hierocrypt, Kalyna and Camellia, and in the stream cipher MUGI and the cryptographic hash function Whirlpool.

References 
 
 
 

Cryptography